Queen Bees is an eight-episode competition series produced by Endemol USA. It aired on The N from July 11 to August 29, 2008. The show brings a group of teen "queen bees" together to live under one roof. Through a series of challenges designed to "bring out the best in them," the girls have to confront their selfish behavior and learn to treat others nicely. The show was hosted by Yoanna House. In the finale, Gisbelle became the winner and donated her winning money to the charity they visited.

Overview 
The concept of the show features seven young women (18 to 20) who are generally mean and rude to everyone around them.  The girls spend time away from their social groups (family and friends), in a shabby house in order to make a lifetime change that includes the girls "changing" the ways they treat others. The contestants compete in different challenges, all with the intent of the girls learning a lesson about the way they treat people in their lives. The competition revolved around the "Progress Report" where the girls are evaluated on their progress by receiving "stars". The winner of the competition is decided by the girl with the most "stars" at the end of the competition.

The progress report is located in the house's "common room" where is also the site of which challenges are given to the girls. After each episode, the show's co-host (Dr. Michelle) meets the girls in the "common room" to evaluate their progress. Dr. Michelle evaluate the girls, one at a time. If the girl has made progress, she will receive a star. If the girl has reverted to their old ways, they lose a star, and if the girl does not progress, or revert, they do not gain or lose a star. On occasions, girls who make outstanding progress will receive two or three stars. At the end of each progress report, the girl with the fewest stars is "put on notice," meaning that if they do not progress by the following evaluation, they will be eliminated from the competition and forced to leave the mansion.

The mansion also features two other concepts. The room dubbed the "Secret Room," is where the girls go individually (usually one girl per episode) to see a taped message from the person that nominated them to be on the show. The other room is dubbed the "Conference Room," in which the girls will go to have a meeting with Dr. Michelle. The girls are sent to Dr. Michelle in either individual or group sessions. In the individual sessions, Dr. Michelle meets the girl in a one-on-one discussion about the girls progress. In the group sessions, all of the girls meet Dr. Michelle, in a discussion usually concerning everything that goes on between the girls in the house. In the end, the girl who earns the most stars wins $25,000.

Progress Report
Every Queen Bee starts off the competition with one star. Their number of earned stars varies after each episode.

Week 1

Week 2

Week 3

Week 4

Week 5

Week 6

Week 7

Week 8 - Overview

Episodes

References

External links 
 

2000s American reality television series
2000s American teen television series
2008 American television series debuts
2008 American television series endings
English-language television shows
The N original programming
Television series about teenagers
Television series by Endemol
Television shows set in Los Angeles